Edward MacDonald (born July 7, 1980) is an American professional stock car racing driver. He most recently competed part-time in the NASCAR K&N Pro Series East in 2018, a series which he competed in for over a decade and a half. In addition, MacDonald raced numerous times in the American Canadian Tour between 2007 and 2018 (including two full seasons in 2016 and 2018), and in the PASS (Pro All Star Series) North. MacDonald has made starts in all three of NASCAR's national touring series, the K&N Pro Series East, and the Whelen Modified Tour.

Much of MacDonald's success has home at New Hampshire Motor Speedway, where he has five wins in the ACT, three in the Pro Series East, and one with the PASS (Pro All Star Series) North. MacDonald also won at Bristol Motor Speedway. He is also a back-to-back, two-time champion of the Oxford 250, winning in 2009 and 2010; MacDonald is only one of three drivers to ever have consecutive wins at Oxford Plains Speedway.

He is nicknamed "The Outlaw".

Racing career

Touring series

MacDonald first ran in the Busch East Series in 2001, finishing 19th in points, and claimed his first series win the following season at Beech Ridge Motor Speedway. After going winless in 2003 and 2004, MacDonald won at Thompson Speedway Motorsports Park; two years later, he would win at Stafford Speedway, and in 2008, won both races at New Hampshire Motor Speedway. In 2009, he won at Loudon again, finishing second in the championship to Ryan Truex. During the season, MacDonald won the Oxford 250 late model race at Oxford Plains Speedway; after electing to replace four tires on a pit stop with the threat of being lapped, MacDonald passed Brian Hoar on lap 167 to win. In 2014, MacDonald won his first Pro Series East race in five seasons and his seventh series win at Bristol Motor Speedway after holding off Gray Gaulding and Ben Rhodes on the green–white–checker finish.

In 2005, MacDonald made his debut in the Whelen Modified Tour at Loudon, finishing 37th. He returned to the Modifieds in 2009 at Loudon, replacing Andy Seuss, who was racing at Caraway Speedway in the Whelen Southern Modified Tour.

MacDonald ran and won the inaugural American Canadian Tour invitational race at Loudon in 2009, and repeated in 2011. In 2014, MacDonald won the ACT season-opener at Lee USA Speedway.

MacDonald is the most recent K&N East driver to have competed when the series had the Busch North name. He made a spot 2019 start in the ARCA Midwest Tour at the Milwaukee Mile and finished in the top 10; it was the first stock car race in five years at the track.

MacDonald has been working with his crew chief Rollie Lachance since the early 2000s; Lachance previously worked with other big names in the New England short track circuit, including Tracy Gordon, Dale Shaw, and Kelly and Ryan Moore.

National series

In 2010, MacDonald made his Camping World Truck Series debut in the TheRaceDayRaffleSeries.com 175 at Loudon for Grimm Racing, finishing 30th after crashing on lap 86. In early 2014, Michael Alden, the owner of Blue Vase Marketing, a sponsor for Cup Series team Go FAS Racing, requested to Go FAS owner Archie St. Hilaire, another New Englander, to put a driver from New England in their No. 32 car for the Camping World RV Sales 301 at Loudon, which led to the team picking MacDonald. This made MacDonald the only active driver at the time to race in all five NASCAR touring series at the track (K&N East, Modified, and the three national series), and the first since Steve Park in 1996. To support MacDonald, the track offered an "Eddie Mac Pack" ticket package worth $32 (matching his car number). In his first Cup race, MacDonald started 40th and finished 35th, five laps down. MacDonald also ran the July Cup races at Loudon in 2015 and 2016.

Personal life
MacDonald's parents, Red and Judy, owned Lee USA Speedway in Lee, New Hampshire. They sold the track in February 2018.

Motorsports career results

NASCAR
(key) (Bold – Pole position awarded by qualifying time. Italics – Pole position earned by points standings or practice time. * – Most laps led.)

Sprint Cup Series

Nationwide Series

Camping World Truck Series

K&N Pro Series East

K&N Pro Series West

Whelen Modified Tour

References

External links
 
 

1980 births
Living people
People from Rowley, Massachusetts
Sportspeople from Essex County, Massachusetts
Racing drivers from Massachusetts
NASCAR drivers
ARCA Midwest Tour drivers